A Munition Girl's Romance is a 1917 British silent thriller film directed by Frank Wilson and starring Violet Hopson, Gregory Scott and George Foley. The screenplay concerns a young woman from a wealthy family who goes to work in a munitions factory during the First World War.

Plot summary
A young woman from a wealthy family goes to work in a munitions factory during the First World War. She falls in love with a designer and help him thwart a plan by the enemy to steal vital blueprints.

Cast
 Violet Hopson as Jenny Jones  
 Gregory Scott as George Brandon  
 George Foley as Sir Harrison  
 Tom Beaumont as Heckman  
 H. Sykes as Pilot

References

Bibliography
 Palmer, Scott. British Film Actors' Credits, 1895-1987. McFarland, 1988.

External links

1917 films
1910s thriller films
British thriller films
British silent feature films
Films directed by Frank Wilson
Films set in England
British black-and-white films
1910s English-language films
1910s British films
Silent thriller films